Moio may refer to several Italian municipalities:

Mojo Alcantara, a municipality in Sicily, Italy
Moio de' Calvi, a municipality  in Lombardy, Italy
Moio della Civitella, a municipality in Campania, Italy
Moio (unit), a unit of measurement used in Portugal and its colonies

See also
Mojo (disambiguation)
Moyo (disambiguation)
Moiola, Italian municipality in the Province of Cuneo, Piedmont